The Minnesota Alcohol and Gambling Enforcement Division (AGED) is a law enforcement agency within the Minnesota Department of Public Safety charged with regulation of alcoholic beverages and gambling, within the U.S. state of Minnesota.

The Alcohol Enforcement Unit issues alcohol manufacturing and wholesale licenses, and approval of some retail licenses. In addition agents investigate compliance with state alcohol laws and regulations, and investigate alcohol-related complaints. The Gambling Enforcement Unit conducts criminal and gaming license background investigations, and monitors the 18 tribal casinos in the state for compliance with the state-tribal compacts. Special investigators conduct inspection and compliance visits to licensed liquor and gambling establishments to ensure compliance with the state liquor and gambling laws and rules.

See also
 Minnesota Department of Public Safety
 Bureau of Alcohol, Tobacco, Firearms and Explosives

References

External links
Minnesota Department of Public Safety, Division of Alcohol and Gambling Enforcement
Minnesota Liquor Laws - State of Minnesota Office of Revisor of Statutes

State alcohol agencies of the United States
State law enforcement agencies of Minnesota
Gambling regulators in the United States
Government agencies established in 1996
1996 establishments in Minnesota